Qoli Kandi (also Romanized as Qolī Kandī) is a village in Quri Chay-ye Sharqi Rural District, in the Central District of Charuymaq County, East Azerbaijan Province, Iran. At the 2006 census, its population was 100, in 18 families.

References 

Populated places in Charuymaq County